The Pasadena Short Line was a line of the Pacific Electric Railway, running from 1902 until 1951, between Downtown Los Angeles and Downtown Pasadena, California.  The route went through Eastside Los Angeles along the foot of the eastern San Rafael Hills to the western San Gabriel Valley.

History

The route began as a horsecar line. In 1894, the Pasadena & Los Angeles Electric Railway purchased, re-gauged, electrified, and double-tracked a section of the line for streetcar use. Service began on May 6, 1895. Pacific Electric acquired the route in 1898. The line was again rebuilt to standard gauge with service between Pasadena and Los Angeles beginning in December 1902. Negotiations to cross the existing roads — the Santa Fe Railway, Terminal Railway, and California Cycleway — led Pacific Electric to build a bridge over the right of ways shortly after their service commenced. In 1908, double tracking was completed throughout.

Peak service was likely reached around 1917 or 1918, with 90 trains operating daily in each direction. Two years later, Pacific Electric had cut that number to 59. Starting November 1926, some morning rush hour trains originated at Mariposa and Lake in Altadena. Service reductions continued throughout the late 1920s and 1930s. A complimenting outbound trip to Altadena began in 1938. Minor reroutes near the line's terminals occurred in 1940 and the Altadena runs ended the following year.

Service was replaced by buses on September 30, 1951. By 1981, all tracks had been removed along the route.

Route
The Pasadena Short Line followed the Monrovia–Glendora Line (Huntington Drive) to Fair Oaks Avenue in South Pasadena (Oneonta Junction). Here, the line branched north along double tracks in the pavement of Fair Oaks Avenue to California Boulevard. It then ran east one block on California Boulevard to Raymond Avenue and then north in the pavement of Raymond Avenue, past Colorado Street several blocks to the North Fair Oaks Carhouse (Located between Raymond and Fair Oaks Avenues). It then exited out the west side of the Carhouse on to Fair Oaks Avenue for its return trip. The Raymond Avenue track was abandoned in 1940 and Fair Oaks Avenue was used in both directions thereafter.

List of major stations

Southern Pacific depot service

Starting on May 1, 1912, some trips along the line began originating at the Los Angeles Southern Pacific station or the Pasadena Southern Pacific station. The Pasadena SP station was closed in 1927, thus the terminus was moved to the Pacific Electric Depot on Raymond Avenue. By August 11, 1932, frequency had been reduced to a single daily franchise car and the service was entirely eliminated on July 30 the following year.

References

Bibliography

 
 

Pacific Electric routes
History of Pasadena, California
History of Los Angeles County, California
Light rail in California
Alhambra, California
Eastside Los Angeles
El Sereno, Los Angeles
Lincoln Heights, Los Angeles
South Pasadena, California
Transportation in Pasadena, California
Railway services introduced in 1902
Railway services discontinued in 1951
1902 establishments in California
1951 disestablishments in California
20th century in Los Angeles
Closed railway lines in the United States